Bobby Gilbert is an Irish former footballer who played for, among others, Derry City and Shamrock Rovers. Gilbert scored in European competitions for both City and Rovers. As an international he also played for the Republic of Ireland.

Derry City
Together with Jimmy McGeough, Jim Crossan and Matt Doherty, Gilbert was a member of the Derry City team that overcame F.C. Lyn Oslo in a European Cup tie in 1965. As a result, City became the first Irish League team to win a European Cup tie over two legs. In the first leg, played away on 31 August, Gilbert headed in two goals in a 5–3 defeat. However, he missed the return leg on 9 September because of injury, but Gilbert's two goals helped City to an 8–6 aggregate win. Legend has that Gilbert's injury resulted from a punch in the head he received in a nightclub the night before the game.

Shamrock Rovers
Having already played for Rovers minors in 1958 Gilbert made his senior debut for Shamrock Rovers on 24 October 1965 in a League of Ireland Shield game against St. Patrick's Athletic and scored a hat-trick as Rovers won 9–1. He went on to finish the 1965–66 season as Rovers' top goalscorer. Together with Liam Tuohy, Johnny Fullam, Pat Dunne, Frank O'Neill, Mick Leech and Paddy Mulligan, Gilbert was a prominent member of the Rovers team that dominated the FAI Cup during the 1960s. He played in three successive finals, finishing on winning side each time. In 1966 they beat Limerick United, in 1967 they St Patrick's Athletic and in 1968 they beat Waterford United. In April 1966 Gilbert scored three goals in the semi-final of the FAI Cup against Waterford United. He scored once in the original 2–2 draw and then twice in a 4–2 replay. During the summer of 1967, Gilbert also played for Rovers when they went to the United States and competed as Boston Rovers in the United Soccer Association league.

One of the highlights of his time with Rovers came in November 1966 when Rovers came close to knocking, Bayern Munich, the eventual winners, out of the European Cup Winners Cup. After holding Bayern to a 1–1 draw at Dalymount Park, goals from Gilbert and Liam Tuohy saw Rovers came back from 2–0 down during the away game. Rovers were winning the tie on away goals when a late goal from Gerd Müller saw Bayern win 3–2 on the night and progress to the next round. Gilbert scored his fourth goal in European competition the following season in a European Cup Winners Cup game against Cardiff City. Gilbert's goal earned Rovers a 1–1 draw in the home leg. However Rovers subsequently lost the tie 3–1 on aggregate.

Republic of Ireland
On 4 May 1966, while playing for Shamrock Rovers, Gilbert made his one and only appearance the Republic of Ireland in friendly against West Germany at Dalymount Park. The Republic lost 4–0 and Gilbert never won another cap.

Honours

Shamrock Rovers

FAI Cup
Winners 1966, 1967, 1968: 3
League of Ireland Shield
Winners 1965–66, 1967–68: 2
Dublin City Cup
Winners 1966–67: 1
Blaxnit Cup
Winners 1967–68: 1
Top Four Cup
Winners 1965–66: 1

Dundalk

Leinster Senior Cup
Winners 1970–71: 1

References

Republic of Ireland association footballers
Republic of Ireland international footballers
Shelbourne F.C. players
Derry City F.C. players
Shamrock Rovers F.C. players
Dundalk F.C. players
League of Ireland players
Portadown F.C. players
NIFL Premiership players
United Soccer Association players
Boston Rovers players
Association footballers from County Dublin
Drumcondra F.C. players
Living people
League of Ireland XI players
Association football forwards
Year of birth missing (living people)